The simple-station NQS Calle 75 is part of the TransMilenio mass-transit system of Bogotá, Colombia, opened in the year 2000.

Location

The station is located in northern Bogotá, specifically on Avenida NQS with Calle 75.

History

This station opened in 2005 as part of the second line of phase two of TransMilenio construction, opening service to Avenida NQS. It serves the demand of the residential area around Calle 75.

The station is named NQS Calle 75 due to its proximity to those two main roads.

Station services

Old trunk services

Main line service

Feeder routes

This station does not have connections to feeder routes.

Inter-city service

This station does not have inter-city service.

See also
Bogotá
TransMilenio
List of TransMilenio Stations

TransMilenio